Jean Ristat, (born 1943 in Argent-sur-Sauldre Cher) is a French poet and writer.

Life
Jean Ristat founded the magazine collection Digraph in 1974, as suggested by his professor of philosophy, Jacques Derrida, which he then put to the recent essay on Plato's Pharmacy  (see the supplement to the edition of 1974).

He is currently the director of French Letters, French literary supplement of the daily L'Humanité.

He is also responsible for publishing the complete writings of Aragon, for whom he is the literary executor.

Awards
 1971 Fénéon Prize, for Du coup d'Etat en littérature
 2008 Mallarmé prize, for Artémis chasse à courre, le sanglier, le cerf et le loup

Works
The Writings of Nicolas Boileau and Jules Verne L'Herne, 1965. Reissued as The lost writings, Gallimard, 1974, with an afterword by Louis Aragon.
Coups d'État in literature, followed by examples from the Bible and ancient authors, Gallimard, 1970.
The entrance to the bay and taking the city of Rio de Janeiro in 1711, a tragi-comedy,followed by The unknown is not anything, dialogue with Roland Barthes, EFR, 1973.
Who are the contemporary, Gallimard, 1975.
Lord B, a novel in letters, with conversations, Gallimard, 1977.
Ode to hasten the coming of Spring, Gallimard, 1978. Reissued in paperback "Poetry", Gallimard, 2008, with a short bio-bibliographic record and a long preface of Omar Berrada.
The wig of the old Lenin,tragi-comedy, Gallimard, 1980.
Digraph, 1974–1981, Flammarion, 1981.
Tomb of Mr. Aragon, Gallimard, 1983. Reissued in paperback "Poetry", Gallimard, 2008, withOde.
The Wreck of the Medusa, heroic comedy, Gallimard, 1986.
The carnage to Pythagoras, occasional poem in four acts written to celebrate the founding of the French Republic, Gallimard, 1991.
The love of parliament, praised Mr. Burattoni sitting on the tomb of Virgil and drawing, Gallimard, 1993.
The place rider, novel, Gallimard, 1996.
Aragon "First I read !", Gallimard, collection "Découvertes Gallimard" (nº 328), 1997.
The death of the beloved tomb, Stock, 1998. Reissued in paperback "Poetry", Gallimard, 2008, withOde.
Olivier Debre, the theater of painting ..., Fragments Editions, 2000.
N Y Meccano, Gallimard, 2001.
With Aragon. 1970–1982, interviews with Francis Cremieux, Gallimard, 2003.
Aragon, the man with the glove, Le Temps des Cerises, 2005.
The Journey to Jupiter and beyond, perhaps, Gallimard, 2006.
Artemis, fox hunting, wild boar, deer and wolf, Gallimard, 2007.
The Theater of the sky. A reading of Rimbaud, Gallimard, 2009.

External links
"Jean Ristat", Loser's Guide, September 25, 2008
"Qui est le contemporain? Jean Ristat", Neophilologus, Springer Netherlands, ISSN 0028-2677, Issue Volume 88, Number 4, October, 2004
 Les Lettres Françaises online edition .

1943 births
Living people
French poets
French male poets
Prix Fénéon winners